This is a list of Croatian football transfers for the 2022–23 winter transfer window. Only transfers featuring Croatian Football League are listed.

Croatian Football League

Note: Flags indicate national team as has been defined under FIFA eligibility rules. Players may hold more than one non-FIFA nationality.

Dinamo Zagreb

In:

Out:

Hajduk Split

In:

Out:

Osijek

In:

Out:

Rijeka

In:

Out:

Lokomotiva

In:

Out:

Gorica

In:

Out:

Slaven Belupo

In:

Out:

Šibenik

In:

Out:

Istra 1961

In:

Out:

Varaždin

In:

Out:

See also
 2022–23 Croatian Football League

References

External links
 Official site of the HNS
 Official site of the Croatian Football League

Croatia
Transfers
2022-23